Katia Aere (born 28 August 1971) is an Italian Para-cyclist. She represented Italy at the 2020 Summer Paralympics.

Career
Aere competed in Paralympic swimming and trained with ASD Polisportiva Trivium

Aere represented Italy in the women's road race H5 event at the 2020 Summer Paralympics and won a bronze medal.

References

External links
 
 KATIA AERE, granapadano.it 
 Katia Aere - AtletaO3 - Handbike | Obiettivo 3

1971 births
Living people
Italian female cyclists
Cyclists at the 2020 Summer Paralympics
Medalists at the 2020 Summer Paralympics
Paralympic medalists in cycling
Paralympic bronze medalists for Italy
Paralympic swimmers of Italy
Paralympic cyclists of Italy
People from the Province of Pordenone
Sportspeople from Friuli-Venezia Giulia
20th-century Italian women
21st-century Italian women